Not Dead Yet is an American television sitcom created by David Windsor and Casey Johnson for ABC. The series premiered on February 8, 2023.

Premise 
The show focuses on Nell Serrano, an accident-prone American newspaper reporter who left her last job five years ago to move to the United Kingdom with a lover. She returns to the U.S. when the relationship ends and tries to resume her journalism career as a newly single woman. Serrano is assigned to write obituaries by her new employer, and begins to encounter ghosts of the people whose obituaries she is writing, whom only she can see and hear. The ghosts begin to have conversations with Serrano, and offer her advice on how to rebuild her life while also helping her write their obituaries by telling her their stories. The ghosts then disappear after their obituaries are published.

Cast and characters

Main
 Gina Rodriguez as Nell Serrano, a journalist whose wedding plans fell apart resulting in her moving back to Los Angeles from London.
 Hannah Simone as Sam, Nell's best friend
 Lauren Ash as Lexi, Nell's boss
 Rick Glassman as Edward, Nell's autistic roommate.
 Joshua Banday as Dennis
 Angela E. Gibbs as Cricket, a widowed owner of a bar that specializes in wine.

Recurring

 Maile Flanagan as Tina
 Jimmy Bellinger as Mason

Notable guest stars

 Martin Mull as Monty, the first ghost Nell encounters and Cricket's late husband.
 Mo Collins as Jane Marvel
 Brittany Snow as Piper, Nell's high school bully.
 Don Lake as Rand
 Julia Sweeney as Terri Lawrence
 Tony Plana as Carlos Garza, a sportscaster who Nell and her father admired when she was growing up.

Episodes

Production

Development
On February 14, 2022, Not Dead Yet was given a pilot order by ABC. It is based on Confessions of a Forty-Something F**k Up by Alexandra Potter. On May 13, 2022, Not Dead Yet was picked up to series by ABC. The series is created by David Windsor and Casey Johnson who are expected to executive produce alongside Rodriguez, McG, Mary Viola and Corey Marsh. 20th Television and Wonderland Sound and Vision serve as production companies for the series. Dean Holland directed the pilot. The series premiered on February 8, 2023.

Casting
On March 29, 2022, Gina Rodriguez was cast in the lead role. On April 5, 2022, Josh Banday, Jessica St. Clair, Mary Elizabeth Ellis, Angela Gibbs, and Rick Glassman joined the cast as series regulars. On May 14, 2022, it was reported that Rodriguez, Banday, and Gibbs are the starring cast members to stay on the series as series regulars due to creative tweaks. Glassman is set to continue on the series, but not as a series regular. In August 2022, Hannah Simone and Lauren Ash were cast as series regulars. On January 11, 2023, it was announced that Martin Mull, Ed Begley Jr., Mo Collins, Deborah S. Craig, Telma Hopkins, Don Lake, Rhea Perlman, Paula Pell, Tony Plana, Brittany Snow, and Julia Sweeney would appear in different episodes as ghosts.

Reception

Critical response
The review aggregator website Rotten Tomatoes reported a 47% approval rating with an average rating of 6.3/10, based on 15 critic reviews. The website's critics consensus reads, "While an always engaging Gina Rodriguez is enough to ensure that this supernatural comedy isn't dead on arrival, it'll need more spark to survive viewer disinterest." Metacritic, which uses a weighted average, assigned a score of 58 out of 100 based on 15 critics, indicating "mixed or average reviews".

Ratings
The premiere episode of Not Dead Yet had about 7.6 million viewers and a 1.76 rating among the 18-49 demographic in the seven days after its premiere on across linear and digital platforms. It is the most-watched comedy debut on ABC in nearly four years.

References

External links
 

2020s American comedy television series
2023 American television series debuts
American Broadcasting Company original programming
English-language television shows
Television series by 20th Century Fox Television
Television series by Wonderland Sound and Vision
Television shows based on books
Autism in television
Television series about ghosts